Pierre Mustapha "Mouss" Diouf (28 October 1964 – 7 July 2012) was a French-Senegalese actor, comedian and humorist.

Acting career
Born in Dakar, Diouf was known for his lead role in The Beast (La bête) and as Baba in Asterix & Obelix: Mission Cleopatra.

1993-1995:Haddaway Mania

Filmography
1968 : Mandabi
1985 : Parole de flic
1985 : Billy Ze Kick
1987 : Lévy et Goliath 
1987 : Mon bel amour, ma déchirure
1989 : L'union sacrée
1989 : Trouble
1989 : 5150
1990 : Au-delà de la vengeance 
1990 : Coma dépassé
1991 : Loulou Graffiti
1991 : Les époux ripoux
1991 : Toubab bi
1991 : On peut toujours rêver
1991 : Les secrets professionnels du Dr Apfelglück
1992 : Loulou Graffiti
1993 : Toxic Affair 
1993 : Coup de jeune 
1995 : Les anges gardiens
1996 : Les 2 papas et la manman
1996 : Le plus beau métier du monde
1997 : Tortilla et cinéma
1997 : Une femme très très très amoureuse
2001 : Philosophale
2002 : Au loin... l'horizon
2002 : Asterix & Obelix: Mission Cleopatra
2002 : The Race
2003 : Méprise et conséquences
2003 : Les grands frères
2005 : La famille Zappon
2007 : Ali Baba et les 40 voleurs
2007 : Le sourire du serpent
2009 : L'absence
2009 : The Beast (La bête)

Television series
 "Navarro" (1991)
 "Berlin Lady" (1991)
 "Julie Lescaut" (1992-2006)
 "Inspecteur Médeuze" (1993)
 "Le Lyonnais" (1993)
 "Acapulco H.E.A.T." (1993)
 "H" (2000)
 "Kelif et Deutsch à la recherche d'un emploi" (2003)

Discography
 "Life" of Haddaway (1993) 
 "What Is Love" of Haddaway with Véronique Genest and Kate Moss (1993) 
 "Rock My Heart" of Haddaway (1994)

Death
He died on 7 July 2012 from complications of a stroke.

References

External links 
 
 

1964 births
2012 deaths
French television presenters
People from Dakar
Serer male actors
French male film actors
French male television actors
Senegalese emigrants to France
Senegalese male film actors
Senegalese male television actors
French comedians
La Ferme Célébrités participants